Jari Neugebauer (born 21 October 1994 in Berlin) is a German professional ice hockey player. He currently plays for Düsseldorfer EG in the Deutsche Eishockey Liga (German Ice Hockey League).

References

External links
 

1994 births
Living people
Düsseldorfer EG players
German ice hockey forwards
Ice hockey people from Berlin